Mid-term parliamentary elections were held in Cuba on 28 February 1904 in order to fill half the seats in the House of Representatives. The Conservative Republican Party won the most seats.

Results

References

Cuba
Parliamentary elections in Cuba
1904 in Cuba
February 1904 events
Election and referendum articles with incomplete results